M. Jagannathan was an Indian politician and former Member of the Legislative Assembly of Tamil Nadu. He was elected to the Tamil Nadu legislative assembly from Tindivanam constituency as a Tamil Nadu Toilers Party candidate in 1952 election and as an Independent candidate in 1957 election.

References 

Members of the Tamil Nadu Legislative Assembly
Tamil Nadu politicians